Pir Sara (also Romanized as Pīr Sarā; also known as Pīreh Sarā) is a village in Sheykh Neshin Rural District, Shanderman District, Masal County, Gilan Province, Iran. At the 2006 census, its population was 580, in 180 families.

References 

Populated places in Masal County